The mayor of Iba, Zambales is the head of the executive branch of Iba, Zambales's government. The mayor holds office at Iba Municipal Hall. Like all local government heads in the Philippines, the mayor is elected via popular vote, and may not be elected for a fourth consecutive term (although the former mayor may return to office after an interval of one term). In case of death, resignation or incapacity, the vice mayor becomes the mayor.

List

(1912–Present)

References

Lists of mayors of places in the Philippines